The 2018–19 Indian Women's League season was the third season of the Indian Women's League, a women's football league in India. The league was started from 5 May 2019 and twelve teams were participated in the league. All the matches were played in Guru Nanak Stadium, Ludhiana.

Qualifiers
State women's leagues organised by various state federations acted as qualifier this season, as the champions of the leagues been awarded a place in the final round.

Teams

Team locations

Foreign players

Final round

Group stage

Cluster I

Cluster II

Knock–out stage

|-
!colspan=4|Semifinals
 
 
|-
!colspan=4|Final
  
|}

Season awards
The awards for the Hero Indian Women's League 2018–19 season:

References

External links
 All India Football Federation.

Indian Women's League
2018–19 in Indian football leagues
2018–19 domestic women's association football leagues
Ind